Cyclamen cyprium (Cyprus cyclamen) is a perennial growing from a tuber, native to woodland at  elevation in the mountains of Cyprus. It is the national flower. Cyclamen persicum and Cyclamen graecum are also found on Cyprus, but are not endemic.

Description
Leaves are heart-shaped with coarsely toothed edges, green variegated with blotches of silver above and purple beneath.

Flowers bloom in autumn to winter, and have 5 upswept petals, white to pale pink with a magenta blotch near the nose. The bases of the petals curve outwards into auricles.

After pollination, flower stems curl, and seeds are borne in round pods, opening by 5 flaps when mature.

Cyclamen ×wellensiekii Iets. is a hybrid obtained in 1969 in the Netherlands between this species and Cyclamen libanoticum – another species of sub-genus Gyrophoebe. This fertile hybrid has pink flowers from November until March.

Gallery

References

External links

Cyclamen cyprium
Cyclamen Society
Pacific Bulb Society
Mark Griffiths Cyclamen species cultivation and photos site - C.cyprium
Mark Griffiths Cyclamen species cultivation and photos site - C.x wellensiekii

cyprium
Cyprus Mediterranean forests
Endemic flora of Cyprus
National symbols of Cyprus